oNgoye Forest, also known as Ngoye or Ngoya Forest, is an ancient coastal scarp forest, protected by the oNgoye Forest Reserve in South Africa's KwaZulu-Natal province. The forest of almost 4,000 ha covers an extensive granite ridge that rises from 200 to 460 metres above sea level. It is found some 10 km inland, or 16 km by road, from the coastal town of Mtunzini, and adjoins smaller forest reserves on its periphery, namely Impeshulu in the west, Ezigwayini in the north, and Dengweni in the south.

History and status
The Zulu king Mpande is the first known person to have afforded protection to oNgoye Forest in the 1800s. Commercial logging occurred in the forest between 1909 and 1924.

The area became an official conservation area in 1992. Cattle grazing, crop cultivation and limited utilization of trees however occur in the protected area, and the edge of the forest is subjected to periodic burning which may reduce the forest area.

Significance

This relict patch of transitional Afromontane-coastal forest is home to rare and endemic species.

It was home to the giant Wood's cycad which is extinct in the wild since the early 1900s, but the oNgoye dwarf cycad, Ground cycad and Natal grass cycad still occur.

It is home to the endemic race ornatus of the Red bush squirrel, the endemic race woodwardi of Woodward's barbet, two undescribed dwarf chameleons similar to the Qudeni dwarf chameleon, the rare Forest green butterfly and the oNgoye centipede.

This forest is an important breeding area for the Eastern bronze-naped pigeon and home to the endangered Spotted ground thrush. At least 165 species of birds have been identified in the area.

Rare trees include Giant umzimbeet, Forest mangosteen, Forest waterberry, Giant pock ironwood, Zulu bead-string, Natal krantz ash, Natal elm and the Pondo fig. Besides the Pondo fig, another six species of Ficus occur.

Bird species diversity and guild composition between the edge (5–10 m from the margin) of primary forest abutting grassland and the deep interior (above 500 m from the margin) in the Dngoye Forest Reserve were compared. Edge and interior sites were chosen that were homogeneous with respect to habitat physiognomy i.e. influences of habitat structure and complexity were insignificant. There were no statistical differences in bird species diversity between the forest edge and interior. However, there was significantly greater species turnover at the edge. The difference in bird species composition between the forest edge and interior was due to various edge-effects: removal of dead wood for firewood, soil compaction by cattle, and generally greater levels of disturbance. We question the wisdom of the generally applied edge-effect principle in the conservation of forest biodiversity. It was suggested that the principle be applied only once there has been critical appraisal of the extent, nature, and effect of an edge and a clear conservation objective with regard to forest birds.

See also
 Forests of KwaZulu-Natal

References

Bibliography
 Pooley, E. (1993). The Complete Field Guide to Trees of Natal, Zululand and Transkei,  - .
 Pooley, T. and Player, I. (1995). KwaZulu-Natal Wildlife Destinations. .

External links
 Zululand Birding Route: Ongoye Forest
 Satellite photo of oNgoye and surrounds

Geography of KwaZulu-Natal
Forests of South Africa
Ezemvelo KZN Wildlife Parks
Tourist attractions in KwaZulu-Natal